The 2012 British Indoor Athletics Championships was the sixth edition of the national championship in indoor track and field for the United Kingdom. It was held from 11–12 February 2012 at the English Institute of Sport, Sheffield, England. A total of 24 events (divided evenly between the sexes) were contested over the two-day competition. It served as a selection meeting for the 2012 IAAF World Indoor Championships.

Results

Men

Women

References 

2012 British Indoor Championships. UK Athletics. Retrieved 2020-01-19.
2012 British Indoor Championships Results. Power of 10. Retrieved 2020-01-19.

British Indoor Championships
British Indoor Athletics Championships
Sports competitions in Sheffield
Athletics Indoor
Athletics competitions in England
February 2012 sports events in the United Kingdom